The 1998 Southeastern Conference baseball tournament was held at Hoover Metropolitan Stadium in Hoover, Alabama from May 13 through 17.  defeated  in the championship game, earning the Southeastern Conference's automatic bid to the 1998 NCAA Division I baseball tournament.

Regular Season Results
The top four teams (based on conference results) from both the Eastern and Western Divisions earned invites to the tournament. The 12 teams played a 30-game conference schedule, playing 10 three-game series. Each team did not play one team from the opposite division.

For the first time, the SEC tournament used the Omaha format, which was first adopted at the College World Series in 1988. The eight teams were seeded and divided into two four-team brackets; seeds 2, 3, 6 and 7 made up bracket one and seeds 1, 4, 5 and 8 made up bracket two. Bracket play was double elimination. The two bracket winners met in a single championship game.

Tournament

Georgia, Ole Miss, Tennessee, and Vanderbilt did not make the tournament.

All-Tournament Team
Most Valuable Player
Rodney Nye, Arkansas

See also
College World Series
NCAA Division I Baseball Championship
Southeastern Conference baseball tournament

References

SECSports.com All-Time Baseball Tournament Results
SECSports.com All-Tourney Team Lists

Tournament
Southeastern Conference Baseball Tournament
Southeastern Conference baseball tournament
Southeastern Conference baseball tournament
College sports tournaments in Alabama
Baseball competitions in Hoover, Alabama